Vin Beasley (1 January 1935 – 19 November 2002) was an Australian racing cyclist. He was part of a family of Footscray cyclists, the son of Jack Beasley, brother of Clinton Beasley and John Beasley and father of Vin Beasley Jr.  He won the Melbourne to Warrnambool Classic in 1952.

References

External links
 

1935 births
2002 deaths
Australian male cyclists
Place of birth missing